The 2004–05 Nashville Predators season would have been their 7th National Hockey League season; however, it was cancelled as the 2004–05 NHL lockout could not be resolved in time to save the season.

Offseason

Schedule
The Predators preseason and regular season schedule were announced on July 14, 2004.

|-
| 1 || September 24 || @ St. Louis Blues
|-
| 2 || September 25 || St. Louis Blues
|-
| 3 || September 26 || @ Florida Panthers
|-
| 4 || October 1 || Columbus Blue Jackets
|-
| 5 || October 2 || @ Columbus Blue Jackets
|-
| 6 || October 8 || Atlanta Thrashers
|-
| 7 || October 9 || @ Atlanta Thrashers
|-

|-
| 1 || October 14 || Minnesota Wild
|-
| 2 || October 16 || St. Louis Blues
|-
| 3 || October 20 || @ Dallas Stars
|-
| 4 || October 21 || San Jose Sharks
|-
| 5 || October 23 || Anaheim Mighty Ducks
|-
| 6 || October 27 || @ Tampa Bay Lightning
|-
| 7 || October 29 || @ Florida Panthers
|-
| 8 || October 30 || Detroit Red Wings
|-
| 9 || November 2 || @ Calgary Flames
|-
| 10 || November 4 || @ Edmonton Oilers
|-
| 11 || November 5 || @ Vancouver Canucks
|-
| 12 || November 8 || @ New York Rangers
|-
| 13 || November 10 || @ New Jersey Devils
|-
| 14 || November 11 || @ New York Islanders
|-
| 15 || November 13 || Colorado Avalanche
|-
| 16 || November 16 || Los Angeles Kings
|-
| 17 || November 18 || @ Calgary Flames
|-
| 18 || November 19 || @ Vancouver Canucks
|-
| 19 || November 22 || @ Edmonton Oilers
|-
| 20 || November 25 || Edmonton Oilers
|-
| 21 || November 27 || San Jose Sharks
|-
| 22 || November 30 || Vancouver Canucks
|-
| 23 || December 2 || @ Chicago Blackhawks
|-
| 24 || December 4 || Atlanta Thrashers
|-
| 25 || December 7 || Philadelphia Flyers
|-
| 26 || December 8 || @ St. Louis Blues
|-
| 27 || December 11 || Colorado Avalanche
|-
| 28 || December 15 || @ Anaheim Mighty Ducks
|-
| 29 || December 16 || @ Los Angeles Kings
|-
| 30 || December 18 || @ San Jose Sharks
|-
| 31 || December 21 || Ottawa Senators
|-
| 32 || December 23 || Anaheim Mighty Ducks
|-
| 33 || December 26 || Dallas Stars
|-
| 34 || December 28 || Chicago Blackhawks
|-
| 35 || December 30 || Toronto Maple Leafs
|-
| 36 || January 1 || Los Angeles Kings
|-
| 37 || January 3 || @ Washington Capitals
|-
| 38 || January 5 || @ Detroit Red Wings
|-
| 39 || January 6 || Calgary Flames
|-
| 40 || January 8 || Carolina Hurricanes
|-
| 41 || January 10 || St. Louis Blues
|-
| 42 || January 12 || @ Atlanta Thrashers
|-
| 43 || January 13 || @ Detroit Red Wings
|-
| 44 || January 15 || Columbus Blue Jackets
|-
| 45 || January 17 || Montreal Canadiens
|-
| 46 || January 19 || @ Dallas Stars
|-
| 47 || January 20 || @ Chicago Blackhawks
|-
| 48 || January 22 || @ Minnesota Wild
|-
| 49 || January 25 || @ Phoenix Coyotes
|-
| 50 || January 26 || @ Anaheim Mighty Ducks
|-
| 51 || January 29 || @ Los Angeles Kings
|-
| 52 || January 30 || @ San Jose Sharks
|-
| 53 || February 3 || Phoenix Coyotes
|-
| 54 || February 5 || Minnesota Wild
|-
| 55 || February 8 || Chicago Blackhawks
|-
| 56 || February 10 || @ Columbus Blue Jackets
|-
| 57 || February 15 || @ St. Louis Blues
|-
| 58 || February 18 || @ Chicago Blackhawks
|-
| 59 || February 20 || New Jersey Devils
|-
| 60 || February 23 || @ Columbus Blue Jackets
|-
| 61 || February 25 || Vancouver Canucks
|-
| 62 || February 27 || Detroit Red Wings
|-
| 63 || March 2 || @ Colorado Avalanche
|-
| 64 || March 4 || @ Columbus Blue Jackets
|-
| 65 || March 6 || Edmonton Oilers
|-
| 66 || March 8 || Calgary Flames
|-
| 67 || March 10 || Phoenix Coyotes
|-
| 68 || March 12 || Dallas Stars
|-
| 69 || March 14 || Columbus Blue Jackets
|-
| 70 || March 16 || @ Detroit Red Wings
|-
| 71 || March 17 || @ Boston Bruins
|-
| 72 || March 19 || @ Buffalo Sabres
|-
| 73 || March 22 || Pittsburgh Penguins
|-
| 74 || March 24 || Florida Panthers
|-
| 75 || March 26 || Chicago Blackhawks
|-
| 76 || March 29 || @ Minnesota Wild
|-
| 77 || March 31 || Detroit Red Wings
|-
| 78 || April 2 || St. Louis Blues
|-
| 79 || April 3 || @ St. Louis Blues
|-
| 80 || April 5 || Columbus Blue Jackets
|-
| 81 || April 8 || @ Colorado Avalanche
|-
| 82 || April 10 || @ Phoenix Coyotes
|-

Transactions
The Predators were involved in the following transactions from June 8, 2004, the day after the deciding game of the 2004 Stanley Cup Finals, through February 16, 2005, the day the  season was officially cancelled.

Trades
The Predators did not make any trades.

Players acquired

Players lost

Signings

Draft picks
Nashville's picks at the 2004 NHL Entry Draft, which was held at the RBC Center in Raleigh, North Carolina on June 26–27, 2004.

Notes

References

Nash
Nash
Nashville Predators seasons
Nashville Predators
Nashville Predators